Xanthocrambus is a genus of moths of the family Crambidae described by Stanisław Błeszyński in 1957.

Species
Xanthocrambus argentarius (Staudinger, 1867)
Xanthocrambus caducellus (Müller-Rutz, 1908)
Xanthocrambus delicatellus (Zeller, 1863)
Xanthocrambus lucellus (Herrich-Schäffer, 1848)
Xanthocrambus saxonellus (Zincken, 1821)
Xanthocrambus watsoni Bleszynski, 1960

References

Xanthocrambus Bleszynski, 1957. Butterflies and Moths of the World. Natural History Museum, London. Retrieved November 23, 2017.

Crambinae
Crambidae genera
Taxa named by Stanisław Błeszyński